Events from the year 1892 in Russia.

Incumbents
 Monarch – Alexander III

Events

 
 
 Mir Bozhiy
 Diamond Trellis Egg
 Franco-Russian Alliance
 Russian famine of 1891–92

Births
 January 10 – Vladimir Littauer, Russian equestrian trainer (d. 1989)

Deaths

References

1892 in Russia
Years of the 19th century in the Russian Empire